ZACube-1 (TshepisoSat), is a South African CubeSat that carries a high frequency beacon transmitter to be used for space weather research. It was launched 21 November 2013 on a Dnepr launch vehicle from Yasny, Russia. Tshepiso is the seSotho word for promise.

Objectives
ZACube-1 carried a high frequency beacon transmitter and a low-resolution CMOS camera in order to perform space weather research, support education and training, enable technology demonstration, and serve as a catalyst for the national nano-satellite programme. The satellite was launched in a Dnepr from the Dombarovsky, which can be found at the following coordinates:

See also

 SUNSAT, first South African satellite
 SumbandilaSat, second South African satellite
 List of CubeSats

References

External links
 French South African Institute of Technology (Spacecraft operator)
 Cape Peninsula University of Technology
 South African National Space Agency (SANSA)

CubeSats
Spacecraft launched in 2013
Space program of South Africa
Spacecraft launched by Dnepr rockets
Space weather